Pelochrista mollitana is a moth belonging to the family Tortricidae. The species was first described by Philipp Christoph Zeller in 1847.

It is native to Europe.

References

Eucosmini